The International Journal of Climatology is a peer-reviewed scientific journal publishing research in the field of climatology. Established in 1981, the journal is published 15 times per year by Wiley-Blackwell on behalf of the Royal Meteorological Society. The editor-in-chief are Enric Aguilar (Universitat Rovira) and William Collins (Lawrence Berkeley National Laboratory). According to the Journal Citation Reports, the journal has a 2020 impact factor of 4.069.

References

Wiley-Blackwell academic journals
Publications established in 1981
English-language journals
Royal Meteorological Society academic journals
Climatology journals
Journals published between 13 and 25 times per year